William Henry Benson (1803, probably in Dublin - 27 January 1870) was a civil servant in British India and an amateur malacologist. He made large collections of molluscs and described numerous species from the U.K., India and South Africa.

He joined Haileybury College in 1819 and joined the East India Company at Bengal. He reached Calcutta on 30 October 1821 and worked in a number of positions including a District Collector and Officiating Judge in Meerut, Bareilly and other parts of northern India. During his stay in India he collected specimens of numerous land snails some of which he sent to Hugh Cuming in England.

On the return from a trip to Mauritius he brought a couple of living Achatina fulica which he gave to a friend in Calcutta in April 1847 who subsequently released them in a garden at Chowringhee. The species is today a pest in many parts of India.

His son-in-law Major Richard Sankey was executor of his estate and the collections that he bequeathed went to Sylvanus Hanley, who removed the locality labels of all the specimens thus decreasing their value.

Bibliography 
A partial list of publications by Benson includes:

 Benson W. B. (1832). "Conchological notes, chiefly relating to the land and freshwater shells of the Doab and the Gangetic Provinces of Hindostan". Journal of the Asiatic Society of Bengal: 75-77.
 Benson W. B. (1836). "Descriptive catagogue of a collection of land and fresh-water shells, chiefly contained in the Museum of the Asiatic Society". Journal of the Asiatic Society of Bengal: 741-750.
 Benson W. B. (1851). "Geographical notices and characters of fourteen new species of Cyclostomacea from the East Indies". Annals and Magazine of Natural History: 184-195.
 Benson W. B. (1852). "Notes on the genus Cyclostoma and characters of new species from India, Borneo and Natal". Annals and Magazine of Natural History:  268-272.
 Benson W. B. (1854). "Characters of four Indian species of Cyclophorus Montfort, Followed by notes on the geographical distribution of the genera of the Cyclostomacea with remarks in its affinities and notes on several opercula". Annals and Magazine of Natural History: 411-418.
 Benson W. B. (1857). "Characters of Streptaulus a new genus and several species of the Cyclostomacea from Sikkim, the Khasi Hills Ava and Pegu". Annals and Magazine of Natural History: 201-211.
 Benson W. H. (1858). "Note sur la transportation et la naturalization au Bengale de l’ Achatina fulica de Lamarck. Journal de Conchyliologie 1: 336-339.
 Benson W. B. (1859). "Description of new species of Helix, Streptaxis, Vitrina, collected by W. Theobald, Jun in Burmah, the Khasi Hills and Hindustan". Annals and Magazine of Natural History: 184-189.
 Benson W. B. (1859). "New Helicidae collected by W. Theobald Esq. Jun in Burmah and the Khasi Hills and characters of a new Burmese Streptaxis described by W. H. Benson Esq." Annals and Magazine of Natural History: 387-392.
 Benson W. B. (1859). "Observations on the shell and animal of Hybocyctis, a new genus of Cyclostomidae based on Megalomastoma gravidum and Otopoma blenus with notes on other living shells from India and Burmah". Annals and Magazine of Natural History: 90-93.
 Benson W. B. (1860). "Characters of new land shells from Burma and the Andamans". Annals and Magazine of Natural History 190-195.
 Benson W. B. (1860). "Notes on Plectopylis, a group a Helicidae distinguished by several internal plicate ephiphragms; with the characters of a new species". Annals and Magazine of Natural History (3)5: 243-247.
 Benson W. B. (1863). "Characters of new land shells of the genus Helix, Clausilia, Spiraxis from Andamans, Moulmein, Northern India and Ceylon". Annals and Magazine of Natural History: 87-91.
 Benson W. B. (1863). "Characters of new land shells from the Andamans island, Burma and Ceylon and of the animal of Sophina". Annals and Magazine of Natural History: 318-323.
 Benson W. B. (1863). "Characters of new operculate land shells from the Andamans and of Indo Burmese species of Pupa". Annals and Magazine of Natural History:  425-429.
 Benson W. B. (1864). "Characters of Coilostele an undescribed genus of Auriculacea and of species of Helix, Pupa and Ancylus from India, West Africa and Ceylon". Annals and Magazine of Natural History: 87-91.

Taxa described by him 
Genera:
 Pterocyclus (Benson, 1832)
 Oxygyrus (Benson, 1835)
 Batillaria (Benson in Cantor, 1842)
 Diplommatina (Benson, 1849)
 Streptaulus (Benson, 1857)
 Dioryx (Benson, 1859)
 Clostophis (Benson, 1860)
 Rhiostoma (Benson, 1860)

Species:
 Carinaria cithara (Benson, 1835)
 Carinaria galea (Benson, 1835)
 Musculista senhousia (Benson, 1842)
 Indrella ampulla (Benson, 1850)

References

Further reading
 Auffenberg K. (2000). "Historical malacology: William Benson (1803-1870)". American Conchologist 28(1): 24.
 Budha P. B. & Naggs F. (2008). "The Giant African Land Snail Lissachatina fulica (Bowdich) in Nepal". The Malacologist: 50: HTM.
 Crosse H. & Fischer P. (1872). "Nécrologie". Journal de Conchyliologie 20(1): 122.

1803 births
1870 deaths
Irish malacologists
Irish zoologists